Bhupesh Gupta (20 October 1914 – 6 August 1981) was an Indian politician and a leader of the Communist Party of India.,  He was one of the senior communist leaders and parliamentarian in Rajya Sabha.

Early life
He was born at Itna, in the erstwhile Mymensingh District of Bengal Province in British India. He studied at the Scottish Church College of the University of Calcutta. Bhupesh Gupta joined the freedom movement of India in his early years when he was active in the Bengal revolutionary group Anushilan Samiti.

He did his Barrister-at-law from University College London and was called to the Bar from the Middle Temple, London. In England he was a close friend of Mrs. Indira Gandhi as both they participated in the activities of the India League, though their political conviction was different in later course.

Later life
He was a member of the Rajya Sabha for five terms from West Bengal, from 3 April 1952 till his death. He was reelected in 1958, 1964, 1970 and 1976. He was a skilled parliamentarian. He died in Moscow on 6 August 1981.

References

Sources
 

Communist Party of India politicians from West Bengal
1914 births
1981 deaths
Rajya Sabha members from West Bengal
Scottish Church College alumni
University of Calcutta alumni